This is a list of parliamentary by-elections in the United Kingdom held between 1857 and 1868, with the names of the previous incumbent and the victor in the by-election and their respective parties.  Where seats changed political party at the election, the result is highlighted: light blue for a Conservative gain, orange for a Whig (after 1859 Liberal) gain, and grey for any other gain.

Resignations
See Resignation from the British House of Commons for more details.

Where the cause of by-election is given as "resignation" or "seeks re-election", this indicates that the incumbent was appointed on his own request to an "office of profit under the Crown", either the Steward of the Chiltern Hundreds, the Steward of the Manor of Northstead or the Steward of the Manor of Hempholme.  These appointments are made as a constitutional device for leaving the House of Commons, whose Members are not permitted to resign.

By-elections

References

 
 British Parliamentary election Results 1832-1885, compiled and edited by F. W. S. Craig (Macmillan Press 1977)
 F. W. S. Craig, British Parliamentary election Statistics 1832-1987
 F. W. S. Craig, Chronology of British Parliamentary By-elections 1833-1987
 Parliamentary election Results in Ireland, 1801-1922, edited by B. M. Walker (Royal Irish Academy 1978)

1857
19th century in the United Kingdom